Metatron is the fourth album by British singer Mark Stewart, released in 1990 through Mute Records.

Track listing

Personnel 
Musicians
The Maffia
Keith LeBlanc – drums
Skip McDonald – guitar
Adrian Sherwood – keyboards, production, mixing, recording
Doug Wimbish – bass guitar
Mark Stewart – vocals, production, mixing, recording

'Additional musicians and production
David Harrow – keyboards, programming
Jill Mumford – design
Nimbus – mastering

References

External links 
 

1990 albums
Albums produced by Adrian Sherwood
Mute Records albums
Mark Stewart (English musician) albums